South Hampshire Reform Jewish Community, a member of the Movement for Reform Judaism, is a Reform Jewish congregation in Hampshire, England. The congregation dates from 1983. Services are held in members’ homes and at community venues in Portsmouth, Southampton and Winchester.

See also
 List of Jewish communities in the United Kingdom
 List of former synagogues in the United Kingdom
 Movement for Reform Judaism

References

External links
Official website

1983 establishments in England
Religious buildings and structures in Hampshire
Reform synagogues in the United Kingdom